The University of Burgos (in Spanish: Universidad de Burgos and often abbreviated UBU) is a public university in the Spanish city of Burgos with about 10,000 students studying over 30 different undergraduate degrees, over 20 PhD Programmes, as well as several Official Masters and other graduate courses.

History 
The University of Burgos was founded in 1994 when it was segregated from the University of Valladolid. Since then it has grown and developed new academic fields placing it in a prominent position among Spanish Universities. From 1994 to 1997 it was governed by a management committee, chaired by Professor of Valladolid Dr. Marcos Sacristán Represa. Its first president was Professor Dr. José María Leal Villalba, from 1997 to 2008. His successor was Dr. Alfonso Murillo Villar.

Campus 
The University of Burgos currently has nearly 10,000 students on two campuses:

San Amaro / Hospital del Rey: Located west of the city of Burgos exiting on the old road towards Portugal (N-620th) and León (N-120). Here are the rector, the central services, library, sports hall, residence and dining hall, the Faculties of Economics and Business, Law, Humanities and Education and the Polytechnic School.
Río Vena / Vigón: Located north of the city in the direction of Cantabria N-623. This campus was the original seat of the Polytechnic School (dependent to the University of Valladolid) and the beginning of the current Polytechnic School of Burgos. Here you will also find the School of Business Studies and the School of Education.

Other facilities
Hospital de la Concepción: Located in the south of the city center, just a few meters from the Burgos Cathedral, its construction dates back to the sixteenth century, though its façade is the seventeenth century. It served as an inn for pilgrims since its inception. In the year 1799 it became home to the Faculty of Medicine, which disappeared by the year 1817. In 2012 rehabilitation work was completed after an investment of more than 7 million euros. The building is now used by the University of Burgos.
Residential and educational complex "Miguel Delibes" located in Sedano in the Valley of Sedano (50 km/31 mi north of Burgos). Situated on 7.4 acres (3 hectares) it is used for the development of courses, meetings, seminars and camps. The site belongs to the University of Burgos, although it is open to the public.

Academic Centres
The University of Burgos conducts its functions in eight different centres, five of their own as well as three associated schools:

The university also has a research and development centre, as well as three institutes:
 Centre of "Research, Development and Innovation"(I+D+i) located in the Science and Technology Park
 Institute of Public Administration
 Institute of Restoration
 Institute for Training and Educational Innovation

Hospital del Rey 

The "Hospital del Rey" now central to the university's campus, is located along the Way of Saint James (Camino de Santiago) passing through west Burgos. It was founded by Alfonso VIII in 1195. Together with the Monastery of Santa María la Real de Las Huelgas it was a great shelter for pilgrims. Upon entry is the shrine of French saint San Amaro and the cemetery where they buried the pilgrims who died in the hospital.

The Hospital del Rey was built during the Renaissance, and retains some remnants of the early medieval hospital (such as the pillars of the old church). The entrance is through the Romeros Gate - now a symbol of the university. It is an arch decorated on both sides, with Jacobean-era references, as well as portraits of the founders (Alfonso VIII and Queen Eleanor).

Access to the Patio de los Romeros, is occupied by the hospital's church which displays a Baroque-style interior. The atrium of the church opens to a section of the school used for ceremonial events. Here you will find the House of Sacristans - the Dean of the School of Law, access to the cafeteria, and the Rectorate building. Here in the beautiful garden setting is the "chessboard" where in summer there are musical activities to coincide with the summer courses at the university.

Various restorations to the remains of the facility earned it the "Europa Nostra" award.

Library 

The university has 5 libraries throughout the campus, one located in each of the 5 academic centres: School of Sciences, School of Law, School of Humanities and Education, the Polytechnic School and the School of Economy and Business where the university's main library is located. The libraries provide information resources for learning, teaching, research and training. It also participates in activities related to the management and operation of the university.

The university has also prepared an online electronic database available 24 hours a day where students and faculty can find books, magazines and download full articles. Services provided by the library include UBUCAT and WorldCat. UBUCAT is a computerized catalogue of the University Library. It allows access to records located in all 5 University of Burgos libraries: books, both print and electronic journals, audiovisual materials, electronic resources, databases, standards, theses and projects read at the University of Burgos, etc. WorldCat provides research access to libraries around the world.

Access to other catalogues include REBIUN (access to various Spanish university libraries), Libraries of the CSIC, National Library of Spain, The European Library, Worldwide Spanish Libraries, Libraries in Castile and León, and Public Libraries of Burgos.
The university's libraries also provide special work stations and research rooms for group work or individual research.

The library contains important old manuscripts.

Degrees and Majors

Arts and Humanities 

 Degree in Spanish: Language and Literature
 Degree in History and Heritage
 Master's Degree in Medieval History of Castile and León (Inter-university)
 Master's Degree in Human Evolution (Inter-university)

Social Science and Law 

 Double Degree in Law and Business Administration
 Degree in Business Administration and Management
 Degree in Political Science and Public Management
 Degree in Audiovisual Communication
 Degree in Law
 Degree in Social Education
 Degree in Finance and Accounting
 Degree in Early Childhood Education
 Degree in Elementary Education
 Degree in Pedagogy
 Degree in Labour Relations and Human Resources
 Degree in Tourism
 Master's Degree in Business Economics (Inter-university)
 Master's Degree in Secondary Education and Baccalaureate, Vocational Training and Language Teaching
 Master's Degree in Education and Inclusive Society

Sciences 

 Degree in Chemistry
 Master's Degree in Advanced Chemistry
 Master's Degree in Tourism Management and Operation of Wine Culture: Wine Tourism in Cuenca del Duero

Engineering and Architecture 

 Degree in Agricultural Engineering and Rural
 Degree in Engineering Building
 Degree in Engineering in Civil Construction Works
 Degree in Engineering Public Works Transport and Urban Services
 Degree in Industrial Engineering
 Degree in Engineering Technology Pathways
 Degree in Industrial Electronics and Automation
 Computer Engineering
 Degree in Mechanical Engineering
 Master's Degree in Industrial Engineering
 Master's Degree in Computer Engineering
 Master's Degree in Fluid Engineering Thermodynamics (Inter-university)
 Master's Degree in Thermal Engineering (Inter-university)

Health Science 

 Degree in Science and Food Technology
 Nursing Degree
 Degree in Occupational Therapy
 Master's Degree in Food Security and Biotechnology

Doctorate programs 

 Advances in Food Science and Biotechnology
 Business Economics
 Education: Historical Perspectives, Policies, and Management Curriculum
 Electrochemistry: Science and Technology
 Physics and Computational Mathematics
 Globalization, New Technologies and Integrated Markets
 Thermal Engineering
 Engineering Research
 Engineering Research in Thermodynamics Fluid
 Lasers and Advanced Spectroscopy in Chemistry
 Heritage and Communication
 Advanced Chemistry

Degrees, Diplomas, Engineering, Technical Engineering and Technical Architecture

Culture and Sport

Theatre 

In 1997, theatre activities were born at the University of Burgos, in an effort to complete the cultural education of the university community and the general public.

The "Aula de Teatro" of the University of Burgos works together with other local institutions throughout the year to organize different and varied cultural events (University Theatre Festival, Open Stage International Festival[Festival Internacional Escena Abierta], concerts, street performances, etc.)

Plays put on include:
 "King John" by William Shakespeare (1997)
 "The King with the Golden Mask" by Marcel Schwob (1998)
 "The Gipsy Celestina" (1999) by Alfonso Sastre
 "Roberto Zucco" by Bernard-Marie Koltès (2000)
 "Ecos y Silencios" based on "Éxodos" by Sebastião Salgado (2001–2002)

Audiovisual Arts Club 

This Film and Audiovisual Club offers:

 Seminars on Cinema and Literature
 Short Film Festival
 Video workshops
 Projection of different films throughout the year

Sport activities 

The University Sports Services offer a wide range of activities throughout the academic year and include:

 Aerobics 
 Archery 
 Badminton 
 Ballroom dancing 
 Basketball
 Climbing 
 Fencing 
 Fitness training 
 Flamenco dancing 
 Football 
 Golf 
 Massage
 Orienteering
 Rugby 
 Sauna 
 Swimming
 Tennis
 Volleyball 
 Weight training 
 Yoga 

Sports Services also organises student excursions such as bike riding, hiking, skiing, and diving.

Foreign Students 

Altogether, the University of Burgos has education agreements with over 100 international academic institutions.

The University of Burgos cooperates with the Erasmus Project, a European Union (EU) student-exchange programme, and each semester hosts students from various countries across the 27-state European Union, as well as Iceland, Liechtenstein, Norway, Malta and associated countries in Eastern Europe. Other countries, such as Cyprus and Turkey are presently under negotiations to participate in this program in the near future.

In addition, many university students from several regions around the world including China, Latin and North America can participate in exchange programmes to study abroad at the University of Burgos. The North American institutions include Millersville University, San Jose State University, North Dakota State University, The Cooper Union, Boston University, University of West Florida, Western Michigan University and participating campuses of the University of California (UC) system.

See also 
 Education in Spain

References

External links

 
 Campus Maps
 Erasmus+ programme
 Campus de excelencia internacional

1994 establishments in Spain
Educational institutions established in 1994
Province of Burgos
Public universities
Universities in Castile and León
Universities and colleges in Spain